Ba Htoo Station (also called Bahtoo Station and Fort Ba Htoo, is a major military base located near Lawksawk (known as Yatsauk in Burmese) in southern Shan State, Myanmar (Burma). Named after Ba Htoo, a colonial military hero, the base was established by the Burmese Armed Forces in November 1953 to house the families of Burmese military officers and provide training to officers. The Army Officers Training School is located on the base.

References 

Forts in Myanmar
Populated places in Shan State
1953 establishments in Burma
Military installations established in 1953
Military installations of Myanmar